Regina Hillsdale was a provincial electoral district for the Legislative Assembly of Saskatchewan, Canada from 1991 to 1995. It was created from territories from Regina Lakeview and Regina Wascana. While it existed, it was represented by NDP MLA Louise Simard. It was dissolved after the 1991 election, following a reduction in the amount of MLAs from 66 to 58. Its territory was divided between the ridings of Regina Lakeview and Regina South.

Election Result 

|-
 
| style="width: 130px" |NDP
|Louise Simard
|align="right"|4,851
|align="right"|51.29
|align="right"|–

 
|Prog. Conservative
|Shirley Shneider
|align="right"|1,677
|align="right"|17.73
|align="right"|–
|- bgcolor="white"
!align="left" colspan=3|Total
!align="right"|9,458
!align="right"|100.00
!align="right"|

References 

Former provincial electoral districts of Saskatchewan